Tightwad is a village in Henry County, Missouri, United States. Its population was 64 at the 2010 United States Census. Tightwad is located along Missouri Route 7.

History and name
Tightwad was originally called Edgewood, for the woods near the original town site.

The village's unusual name is said to stem from an episode in which a store owner cheated a customer, who was a postman, by charging him an extra 50 cents for a better watermelon. Some sources claim the transaction involved a rooster rather than a watermelon. 
Due to its proximity to Truman Reservoir, Tightwad saw some limited growth starting in the mid-1980s. As of 2010, the village's business district included a bank (see below), café, tavern, and convenience store. As of April 2019, the bank is now closed and is being used for personal use. The café was bought after sitting vacant for many years and is now being used as an antique store called the "Nook and Cranny" and most recent with the addition of a Dollar General within the business district, the local convenience store was forced to close their doors, and is in the process of being turned into apartments. Tightwad also had an additional business added off of Highway 7, down Highway PP called Hickory Hollow Resort, which rents cabins and Rv spots. They now have a bait store and a diner called Donnas Drive Inn.

Geography

Demographics

The median income for a household in the village was $24,375, and the median income for a family was $51,250. Males had a median income of $35,417 versus $30,625 for females. The per capita income for the village was $18,981. There were no families and 16.7% of the population living below the poverty line, including no under eighteens and 21.4% of those over 64.

2010 census
As of the census of 2010, there were 69 people, 31 households, and 18 families residing in the village. The racial makeup of the village was 98.6% White and 1.4% from two or more races.

There were 31 households, of which 19.4% had children under the age of 18 living with them, 48.4% were married couples living together, 3.2% had a female householder with no husband present, 6.5% had a male householder with no wife present, and 41.9% were non-families. 32.3% of all households were made up of individuals, and 9.7% had someone living alone who was 65 years of age or older. The average household size was 2.23 and the average family size was 2.72.

The median age in the village was 53.5 years. 21.7% of residents were under the age of 18; 2.8% were between the ages of 18 and 24; 15.8% were from 25 to 44; 30.4% were from 45 to 64; and 29% were 65 years of age or older. The gender makeup of the village was 50.7% male and 49.3% female.

Tightwad Bank
The first Tightwad Bank opened in 1984 as a branch of the Citizens Bank of Windsor (Windsor, Missouri) at first housed in a portable trailer then eventually a one-story brick building still in use today.(Now currently out of business) Publicity over the unusual name eventually led to deposits totalling over $2 million. However an expected business boom from nearby Truman Reservoir never materialized and the bank fell victim to armed robbery twice in the 1990s. Thus in November 2006, UMB, the bank's owner at the time, announced that the Tightwad branch bank would close and accounts would be shuffled to UMB locations in Warsaw and Clinton, Missouri.
In May 2008, Tightwad Bank was reopened, under new ownership, as an FDIC insured institution. The bank is a full-service branch of the former Reading State Bank, Reading, Kansas. To capitalize on the notoriety of the unusual name, the Reading locations' name was changed to Tightwad Bank as well. "We're seeking the customers with a sense of humor", admitted bank co-owner Donald Higdon in a 2008 interview with The Washington Post. In 2010 the two locations of Tightwad Bank reported combined deposits of over $20 million (US).

As of July 2018 Tightwad Bank in Tightwad Missouri is closed.  New owners indicated it would be reopening as an antique store. However in the time being, the new owner is using the bank as a storage building for personal belongings.

References
 

Villages in Henry County, Missouri
Villages in Missouri
Populated places established in 1984